Konstantinos "Kostas" Triantafyllopoulos (born 3 April 1993) is a Greek professional footballer who plays as a centre-back for Polish club Pogoń Szczecin.

Career
On 30 September 2012, during a Superleague match vs. Asteras Tripolis, he made his debut for the men's team with Panathinaikos.
In his first season as a Panathinaikos' player, Triantafyllopoulos was able to become the first choice for the center of defence. At the end of the season, Triantafyllopoulos signed a contract extension for three years.
On 22 January 2016, Triantafyllopoulos signed a 3,5 years contract with Asteras Tripolis, despite the rumours that he will sign to Panionios, as part of Olivier Boumale transfer to Panathinaikos. His former club will keep a percentage of the profit from his next transfer.

On 13 June 2019, he joined Pogoń Szczecin on a two-year deal. On 10 August 2019, he scored his first goal with the club in a 1–0 home win game against Wisła Kraków contributing the most to his team's win. On 20 May 2021, Pogoń Szczecin announced the renewal of the 28-year-old Greek defender's contract for one year with the possibility of extending their cooperation for another season.

Career statistics

(* includes Eurοpa League, Champions League) (** Greek Playoffs)

Honours
Panathinaikos
 Greek Cup: 2013–14

International
Greece U19
UEFA European Under-19 Championship runner-up: 2012

References

External links

pao.gr
UEFA.com

1993 births
Living people
Footballers from Corinth
Association football defenders
Greek footballers
Greece under-21 international footballers
Greece youth international footballers
Panathinaikos F.C. players
Asteras Tripolis F.C. players
Pogoń Szczecin players
Super League Greece players
Ekstraklasa players
Greek expatriate footballers
Expatriate footballers in Poland
Greek expatriate sportspeople in Poland